An Abendhauptschule ("Evening Hauptschule") is a German class of secondary school for mature students to allow them to gain the Hauptschulabschluss. Classes are usually held in the evening.

See also
 Abendgymnasium
 Abendrealschule

References

Education in Germany
School types
Adult education